Liptena despecta, the small black liptena, is a butterfly in the family Lycaenidae. It is found in Nigeria (east and the Cross River loop), Cameroon, Gabon, the Democratic Republic of the Congo (Uele, North Kivu, Tshopo and Lualaba), Uganda and north-western Tanzania. The habitat consists of forests.

References

Butterflies described in 1890
Liptena
Butterflies of Africa